Y&T (originally known as Yesterday & Today) is an American hard rock/heavy metal band formed in 1972 in Oakland, California, with the line up that would record the first album cementing in 1974. The band released two studio albums on London Records as Yesterday & Today in the 1970s, before shortening their name to Y&T and releasing several albums on A&M Records beginning in 1981, plus albums on Geffen Records, Avex Records, and others. The band was originally co-managed by Herbie Herbert and Louis "Lou" Bramy. The band has sold over 4 million albums worldwide to date, output summarised as 18 albums, three greatest hits collections and a boxed set.

Biography

Early years (1972–1983)
Leonard Haze, Bob Gardner, and Wayne Stitzer had an unnamed band in Oakland, California that jammed only cover tunes. Dave Meniketti joined as guitar player in 1972. Soon after, the band received a call for their first gig, but they needed a name. According to Meniketti and Haze, Haze chose the name of the album that was playing on his turntable at that moment – Yesterday and Today – a studio album by the Beatles. The first lineup – which only played covers of songs by other artists – consisted of Haze on drums, Stitzer on piano, Gardner on bass, and Meniketti on lead vocals and lead guitar. After Stitzer quit the group, Gardner switched from bass to rhythm guitar and piano, and Phil Kennemore was brought in to play bass. In 1973, Gardner left the group and was replaced by Joey Alves in January 1974. It was this 1974 lineup change when the band began writing original material.

The band did shows with Journey and other acts including Queen, and during a show as part of the latter's Night at the Opera tour, Y&T were seen by the president of London Records (who had been invited), and were subsequently signed to the label. London released first two studio albums, a self-titled debut and Struck Down, in 1976 and 1978 respectively. While finishing their second album, London disclosed they would be getting rid of all their rock artists, and Meniketti has since commented that this essentially meant that Struck Down "would go nowhere." The band continued to tour extensively, building up to headliners while they opened for bands such as Wild Cherry, AC/DC, and Kiss.

As Meniketti has said in numerous radio, television, and magazine interviews over the past four decades, a new record deal ("which took forever" [to secure]) in 1980 with A&M Records prompted the band to shorten their name to simply Y&T, as influenced by their encores where fans would chant "Y&T, Y&T, Y&T."

The band's first two studio albums under A&M, Earthshaker (1981) and Black Tiger (1982), did not gain mainstream exposure. Songs off these two albums still make up a significant part of the band's live shows. Black Tiger was recorded at Ridge Farm, in Dorking, County of Surrey, England and produced by Max Norman. The classic Y&T logo made its first appearance on the cover of this album. Part-way through recording Black Tiger, the band did their first shows outside the US; Netherlands followed by the UK.

By 1983, in spite of their lack of notable success, Y&T were starting to play at larger venues such as arenas, stadiums and amphitheaters across America and Europe, with a variety of acts including AC/DC, Alice Cooper, Blackfoot, Dio, Iron Maiden, Marillion, Mötley Crüe, Ozzy Osbourne, Twisted Sister and ZZ Top, garnering far more mainstream recognition in Europe and Japan than they did in their native America. With their third A&M release, Mean Streak (1983), radio airplay and exposure had increased in the US despite poor promotion from the record company.

Commercial success and brief hiatus (1984–1991)
Y&T's sixth studio album, In Rock We Trust, released in 1984, became the band's highest-charting and selling album, reaching No. 46 on the Billboard 200. The album produced Y&T's first big radio hit "Don't Stop Runnin'". Dr Pepper acquired the rights to use "She's a Liar" in a radio ad campaign. To date, In Rock We Trust has sold over 450,000 copies. This album was the only Y&T album to chart in Canada, reaching No. 77 on the RPM chart. The label brought in writer Geoffrey Leib for the album, the first time an external writer had been used. The success of In Rock We Trust, which saw the band continuing to perform at arenas and stadiums (including opening for Rush and Dio on their tours for Grace Under Pressure and The Last in Line respectively, as well as playing with Whitesnake, Twisted Sister, Ratt, Dokken and Night Ranger), and participating in the 1984 edition of Monsters of Rock at Donington Park in England, gave Y&T better exposure than they had before.

The band's 1985 hit "Summertime Girls", initially featured as the sole studio track on the band's first live album, Open Fire, and later also featured on their seventh (studio) album Down for the Count released later the same year, became the band's highest-charting hit to date, reaching No. 55 on the Billboard Hot 100 and No. 16 on the Mainstream Rock songs chart.  It received airplay worldwide, played frequently in the Baywatch television series, featured in several feature films (including Real Genius), received heavy rotation on MTV as well as MTV's top video playlists, and continues to get regular airplay today on classic rock radio stations throughout the United States. Down for the Count would be the band's last album for A&M, the band increasingly frustrated with the levels of promotion from the label within the US. Despite successful tours with Mötley Crüe and Aerosmith and the chart success of "Summertime Girls", the label declined to release a follow-up single. On his recollection of Down for the Count, Meniketti said in an interview for Metal Express Radio: "...it ended up being a sort of wasted record... ...it was out right when a record company didn't care about us." The band still play tracks from the album in their live shows.

In 1986, the band changed record labels to Geffen, and in that same year, Haze was fired for drug abuse issues (as Haze, band, and management discuss in the documentary "Y&T: On With the Show"), and was replaced by Jimmy DeGrasso; decades later when interviewed for the documentary Y&T: On With the Show, Haze said, "I would've fired me too."

In 1987 the eighth album Contagious was released. In 1989, Alves was also fired for drug abuse and was replaced by Stef Burns. DeGrasso and Burns later played together with Alice Cooper in the 1990s. Y&T's next studio album Ten was released in 1990. The album features ballads such as "Don't Be Afraid of the Dark" (the first and only single from the album), "Ten Lovers", and "Come in from the Rain", together with a few straightforward hard rock songs, including "Hard Times", "City", "Surrender", and the fastest track Y&T ever recorded, "Goin' Off the Deep End". According to Meneketti, the video for "Don't Be Afraid of the Dark" was probably the best video they ever made, but with the onset of grunge he never once saw it on MTV.

With the record company opting not to release any further singles from the Ten album, the band decided to do seven more shows in California and discontinue in 1991, concluding with the live album Yesterday & Today Live. Shortly after the 1991 split Meneketti declined an opportunity to form a proposed 'super group' with Peter Frampton.

Reunion (1995–present)

In 1995, Y&T returned with the same lineup of Meniketti, Burns, Kennemore, and DeGrasso, releasing Musically Incorrect in 1995 and Endangered Species in 1997. The band performed sporadically during the mid to late 1990s. Y&T officially reunited in 2001 with virtually the same lineup, but with Haze returning on drums. At the time, Burns was in three bands: Y&T, Huey Lewis and the News, and Italy's biggest rock star, Vasco Rossi; scheduling conflicts forced Burns to drop one of the three bands, and so in 2003, he left Y&T.  He was replaced by rhythm guitarist/backing vocalist John Nymann, who was a childhood friend of the band, and who previously toured on the In Rock We Trust tour as a background vocalist and Rock the Robot, and he sang backing vocals on Down for the Count.

Y&T resumed touring the world in 2003. In 2006, Haze was asked to step down and was replaced by Mike Vanderhule on drums.

In 2009, Y&T inked a deal with the Italian label Frontiers Records for the release of the band's twelfth studio album, released in May 2010. Titled Facemelter; it was their first proper studio album in thirteen years (since 1997's Endangered Species).

In June 2010, Y&T toured the world in support of Facemelter, performing the big European summer festivals, such as Sweden Rock, Download Festival at Donington Park, UK, and Hellfest in Clisson, France. During this world tour, bassist Kennemore was diagnosed with stage IV lung cancer. Upon receiving doctor's orders to leave the tour and begin treatment, Kennemore urged Meniketti to find a replacement and continue touring.

In July 2010, Brad Lang, bass player from the band Jet Red, stepped in to play live for the band as they promoted 'Facemelter', as Kennemore wanted the tour to carry on during his fight with cancer. On January 7, 2011, bassist Kennemore died at the age of 57 after a short battle with lung cancer.  Kennemore and Meniketti had been the only constant members of the band since 1974.  After Kennemore's passing, Lang was asked to become an official member of the band.

On October 19, 2013, in Bellagio, Italy, Burns joined the band onstage for four songs (Black Tiger, Dirty Girl, Midnight In Tokyo, and Hurricane) in a reunion of sorts since Burns had been playing with Huey Lewis and the News and Vasco Rossi. This one-time reunion was very well received by the fans, as one would expect.

In April 2016, Lang left the band to properly address his alcohol dependency; his last show with the band was on April 2, 2016, at the Fillmore in San Francisco. Lang's friend Aaron Leigh (Frank Hannon Band) stepped in with his first show on April 14 at the Canyon Club in Agoura Hills, CA. On June 29, 2016, Y&T and Lang announced separately on their own Facebook feeds that they had mutually and amicably parted ways, confirming that Leigh would remain as the band's bassist.

Songwriter and original drummer Haze died on September 11, 2016, at the age of 61 after a long battle with chronic obstructive pulmonary disease. Original guitarist Alves died on March 12, 2017, at the age of 63 from ulcerative colitis and inflammatory bowel disease.  Alves' death left Meniketti as the last surviving member from the band's original and classic 1974-1986 lineup.

In January 2018, Y&T released their first-ever acoustic EP titled Acoustic Classix Vol. 1. In June 2018, Meinketti said that the band might release more acoustic EPs in the future.

On November 26, 2019, the long-awaited, fan-backed (on Kickstarter) documentary Y&T: On With the Show was released.

Legacy
"Summertime Girls" has been the band's most widely recognized song, along with fan favorites such as "Mean Streak", "Contagious", "Rescue Me", "Forever".

Music videos for songs such as "Summertime Girls", "Mean Streak", "Lipstick & Leather", "Don't Stop Runnin'", "Don't Be Afraid of the Dark", and "Contagious" are still featured on VH1 Classic.

Y&T's 2010 music video for "I'm Coming Home" marks the band's most-viewed video on YouTube with over 1.7 million views.

In the movie Anvil! The Story of Anvil, in the bonus feature interview Lars Ulrich of Metallica talks at length about seeing one of his favorite bands Y&T for the first time at a club in Hollywood in December 1980. Ulrich credits Y&T as the reason he decided to become a musician, saying: "That was the turning point for me wanting to play music. . . . You could tell that they loved what they were doing."

Band members

Current members
 Dave Meniketti – lead guitar, lead vocals (1974–present)
 John Nymann – rhythm guitar, backing vocals (2003–present)
 Mike Vanderhule – drums, backing vocals (2006–present)
 Aaron Leigh – bass, backing vocals (2016–present)

Former members
 Leonard Haze – drums, backing and lead vocals (1974–1986, 2001–2006; died 2016)
 Phil Kennemore – bass, keyboards, backing and lead vocals (1974–1991, 1995–2011; died 2011)
 Joey Alves – rhythm guitar, backing vocals (1974–1989; died 2017)
 Jimmy DeGrasso – drums (1986–1991, 1995–2001)
 Stef Burns – rhythm guitar, backing vocals (1989–1991, 1995–2003)
 Brad Lang – bass, backing vocals (2010–2016)

Session members
 Robert Russ – piano on Struck Down (1978)
 Cherie Currie – backing vocals on Struck Down (1978)
 Galen Cook – organ on Struck Down (1978)
 Randy Nichols – keyboards on Down for the Count (1985)
 Steffen Presley – keyboards on Down for the Count (1985) and Contagious (1987)
 Claude Schnell – keyboards on Down for the Count (1985)
 Adam Day – rhythm guitar on Down for the Count (1985)
 Bill Costa – backing vocals on Down for the Count (1985)
 Steve Smith – drums on "Hard Times", "Lucy", "Don't Be Afraid of the Dark", "Girl Crazy", "Come in from the Rain", "Red Hot & Ready", "Let It Out", "Ten Lovers", and "Surrender" from Ten (1990)
 Loren Gold – keyboards on Facemelter (2010)
 Ross McEwen - guitar for Ramblin' Man Fair and Rock and Blues Custom Show Festivals, (July 28 & 29, 2017)

Timeline

Discography

Studio albums
 Yesterday and Today (1976)
 Struck Down (1978)
 Earthshaker (1981)
 Black Tiger (1982)
 Mean Streak (1983) (US#103)
 In Rock We Trust (1984) (US#45)
 Down for the Count (1985) (US#91)
 Contagious (1987) (US#78)
 Ten (1990)
 Musically Incorrect (1995)
 Endangered Species (1997)
 Facemelter (2010)

Extended plays
 Acoustic Classix Vol. 1 (2018)

Live albums
 In Concert (1984) (BBC Transcription Services - Copyright recording for radio broadcast only)
 Open Fire (1985) (US #70) 
 Yesterday & Today Live (1991)
 Live on the Friday Rock Show (1998) (recorded 1982 and 1984, reissued in 2000 as BBC Live in Concert)
 Live at the Mystic (2012)
 Free to Roll (Live 1985) (2022)

Compilation albums
 Forever - Best of Y&T (1987) (Japan only)
 Anthology (1989) (UK only)
 Best of '81 to '85 (1990)
 Ultimate Collection (2001)
 Unearthed Vol. 1 - Demos & Unreleased Recordings from 1974 Through 2003 (2003)
 Unearthed Vol. 2 - Demos & Unreleased Recordings from 1974 Through 1989 (2004)
 Earthquake - The A&M Years 1981-1985 (2013) (4-CD box set)

Singles

Contributions
 Hear 'n Aid (1986)

Videography
Videos
 Live at the San Francisco Civic (1985)

DVDs
 One Hot Night (DVD) (2007)
 Documentary - Y&T: On With the Show (DVD) (2019)

Official promo videos
 "Mean Streak" (from the album Mean Streak, 1983)
 "Don't Stop Runnin'" (from the album In Rock We Trust, 1984)
 "All American Boy" (from the album Down For The Count, 1985)
 "Summertime Girls" (from the album Open Fire, 1985)
 "Lipstick & Leather" (from the album In Rock We Trust, 1984 with Video footage of Live at the San Francisco Civic, 1985)
 "Contagious" (from the album Contagious, 1987)
 "Don't Be Afraid Of The Dark" (from the album Ten, 1990)
 "I'm Coming Home" (from the album Facemelter, 2010)

References

External links

 Official website
 
 A&M Records artist page

1974 establishments in California
A&M Records artists
Glam metal musical groups from California
Hard rock musical groups from California
Heavy metal musical groups from California
London Records artists
Musical groups from Oakland, California
Musical groups established in 1974
Musical groups disestablished in 1991
Musical groups reestablished in 1995
Musical groups disestablished in 1997
Musical groups reestablished in 2001
Musical quartets